Rahil Mammadov (born 24 November 1995 in Baku, Azerbaijan) is an Azerbaijani footballer who currently plays for Qarabağ FK and the Azerbaijan national football team.

Career

Club
On 22 December 2017, Mammadov signed contract with Sabail FK.

On 2 June 2018, Rahil signed 3 years contract with Qarabağ FK.

On 9 February 2022, Mammadov joined Zira on loan for the remainder of the 2021–22 season.

International
On 27 March 2018, Mammadov made his senior international debut for Azerbaijan game against Macedonia.

Career statistics

International

Statistics accurate as of match played 11 June 2019

Honours

International
Azerbaijan U23
 Islamic Solidarity Games: (1) 2017

References

External links
 

1995 births
Living people
Footballers from Baku
Azerbaijani footballers
Association football defenders
Neftçi PFK players
Sabail FK players
Qarabağ FK players
Azerbaijan Premier League players
Azerbaijan international footballers
Azerbaijan under-21 international footballers
Azerbaijan youth international footballers